James M. Cross (January 29, 1933 – May 2, 2020) was an American ice hockey player and coach who led the Vermont Catamounts of the University of Vermont for nineteen seasons.

Playing career
Cross graduated from Boston University in 1960, having played ice hockey for the Terriers for two seasons. In his senior year, he helped the team record a third-place finish at the 1960 NCAA men's ice hockey tournament. While at BU, Cross played collegiate summer baseball with the Dennis Clippers of the Cape Cod Baseball League.

Coaching career
After graduating from BU, Cross became the director of physical education at Lyman C. Hunt School, a position he held for four years before accepting the head coaching position at nearby Vermont. Cross joined the program in only its third year of existence and took a few years to get the team going in the right direction. In 1970 Cross won his first ECAC 2 tournament title but did not participate in the national tournament because the Division II championship did not start until 1978. After two more good seasons Cross's teams won back-to-back ECAC II titles, and went undefeated in conference play in 1973, earning Cross the Edward Jeremiah Award that year.

In 1974 Vermont promoted its program to Division I and was immediately accepted into ECAC Hockey. The Catamounts exceeded general expectation by finishing the season with a 24–12 record and in third place in the conference. The team also finished third in the ECAC tournament. After this promising start, Vermont declined to middling records for four years before winning an ECAC West divisional title in 1980. The 1979–80 season was Cross's last winning season, and over his final four years Vermont finished no higher than 12th in the conference. In 1984 Cross resigned, saying, "I want to step aside before I get to the burnout stage."

Cross remained with the University of Vermont until his retirement in 1994 and two years later was inducted into the University of Vermont Athletic Hall of Fame. He was honored in 2001 with the American Hockey Coaches Association's John MacInnes Award, which "recognizes those people who have shown a great concern for amateur hockey and youth programs." In 2019, Cross received the prestigious Hobey Baker Legends of College Hockey Award, and in 2020, he was inducted into the Vermont Sports Hall of Fame.

Later life and death
In his later years, Cross lived in Savannah, Georgia, and died there of complications from COVID-19 on May 2, 2020, at age 87, during the COVID-19 pandemic in Georgia (U.S. state).

College head coaching record

References

External links

1933 births
2020 deaths
American men's ice hockey centers
Boston University Terriers men's ice hockey players
Cape Cod Baseball League players (pre-modern era)
Yarmouth–Dennis Red Sox players
Vermont Catamounts men's ice hockey coaches
Sportspeople from Weymouth, Massachusetts
Ice hockey coaches from Massachusetts
Deaths from the COVID-19 pandemic in Georgia (U.S. state)
Ice hockey players from Massachusetts